Frank H Wharton (April 11, 1870 - 2 August 1956) was the fourth mayor of Miami from 1907 to 1911.

Life 

Born in Rockbridge Ohio, Wharton was the son of farmers and moved to Miami in 1897, after working in Central Florida.

In 1907 Wharton was elected Mayor for a two-year term.  He won re-election in 1909. 

Wharton served as City Manager in 1921.

See also 

 List of mayors of Miami
 Government of Miami
 History of Miami

References

External links 
 HistoryMiami official website of HistoryMiami (formerly the Historical Museum of Southern Florida)
 Findagrave Frank H Wharton

1870 births
Mayors of Miami
1956 deaths